Arazbar (also, Arasbar, Arazbarı, Araspar, Arasparlu, and Arazbary) is a village and municipality in the Aghjabadi Rayon of Azerbaijan.  It has a population of 1,279.

References 

Populated places in Aghjabadi District